His Secretary is a 1925 American silent comedy film directed by Hobart Henley. The film stars Norma Shearer and Lew Cody.

Plot
As described in a film magazine review, Ruth, a young woman who is in love with her employer but is ignored by him and all other men, learns the reason for her unpopularity while she is on a trip as her employer’s secretary. She overhears her boss saying he would not kiss her for a thousand dollars. After their return, and after a change in her character and outlook, her employer attempts to make love to her. She rejects him in a manner that piques him, and later he declares his love for her.

Cast

Preservation
With no prints of His Secretary located in any film archives, it is a lost film.

References

External links

Poster and stills at normashearer.com

1925 films
1925 comedy films
Silent American comedy films
American silent feature films
American black-and-white films
Films directed by Hobart Henley
Lost American films
Metro-Goldwyn-Mayer films
1925 lost films
Lost comedy films
1920s American films